Annpurna Devi Yadav (born 2 February 1970) is an Indian politician, who is the current Minister of State for Education in the Second Modi ministry. She is also a Member of Parliament in Lok Sabha (lower house of the Parliament of India) from Kodarma, Jharkhand in which she won the 2019 Indian general election as member of the Bharatiya Janata Party. She is also one of the National Vice Presidents of BJP. Previously, she was elected to the Jharkhand Legislative Assembly, from Kodarma (Vidhan Sabha constituency) as a member of the Rashtriya Janata Dal.

References

External links
Official biographical sketch in Parliament of India website

Narendra Modi ministry
Women in Jharkhand politics
Bharatiya Janata Party politicians from Jharkhand
Rashtriya Janata Dal politicians
Living people
Lok Sabha members from Jharkhand
India MPs 2019–present
People from Kodarma
Members of the Jharkhand Legislative Assembly
Members of the Bihar Legislative Assembly
Jharkhand politicians by Rashtriya Janata Dal
1970 births
Women union ministers of state of India
Women members of the Lok Sabha
21st-century Indian women politicians